Stuart Burrows  (born 7 February 1933) is a Welsh operatic tenor.

Biography

The Cilfynydd-born singer was born on William Street, the same birthplace as fellow opera star Sir Geraint Evans, Welsh rugby international Glyn Davies, and politician Lord Merlyn-Rees. 

As a boy, Burrows sang soprano from his bedroom window to neighbors on the street below. His first solo performance was as a congregation member at the local Bethel Chapel, where he performed "Bless This House."

He began his working career as a teacher in Bargoed, but his talent as a tenor soon brought him attention. His recitals included works by Beethoven, Berlioz, Schubert, Sullivan, Tippett, Tchaikovsky, Mahler, Offenbach, and Handel. He has earned worldwide recognition for being adept at oratorios and operas and specializing in the music of Puccini, Verdi, Donizetti, and especially Mozart, earning him the title of "The King of Mozart." 

In 1963, Burrows debuted with the Welsh National Opera as Ismael in Verdi's Nabucco. In 1967, his performance during the Athens Festival brought him international acclaim with a performance of Igor Stravinsky's Oedipus rex.

He made his debut with La Scala in Milan in 1978, singing the title role in Berlioz's La damnation de Faust. In New York, Burrows worked with Sir Georg Solti, Zubin Mehta, Seiji Ozawa, Leonard Bernstein, and Eugene Ormandy, among others, at Carnegie Hall. He has also appeared in significant roles at the Metropolitan Opera in New York City and collaborated with several other orchestral organizations, including the Academy of St Martin in the Fields, the Boston Symphony, the London Symphony Orchestra, and the Royal Philharmonic Orchestra. He has also had several professional performances in the rarefied altitudes of Santa Fe, New Mexico.

Some of his performances include Don Giovanni in Brussels and at the San Diego Opera, Madam Butterfly in Vienna, Faust in Milan, L'elisir d'amore and The Magic Flute in San Francisco, Die Entführung aus dem Serail at the Paris Opéra; Tales of Hoffmann at the Theatre Cologne and the Théâtre de la Monnaie in Belgium, the Mozart Requiem at the Cardiff Festival of Choirs in Wales. Burrows performed many times with the Royal Opera, including roles in Don Pasquale, Maria Stuarda, and La sonnambula, and touring Japan and the USA.

Although known for live and recorded performances, Burrows also made television appearances. He has appeared on the small screen in Australia, North America and Europe, including a successful BBC television series called Stuart Burrows Sings.

Burrows has been received several awards and fellowships, including an Honorary Doctorate from the University of Wales in 1981, a fellowship from Trinity College, Carmarthen in 1989, an honorary fellowship from the University of Wales at Aberystwyth, and an honorary plaque affixed to a Le Shuttle locomotive granted by Eurotunnel in 1992. Also, in 2007, Burrows was appointed an Officer of the Most Excellent Order of the British Empire (OBE).

He has also contributed to singers and charitable causes, launching an International Singing Competition and establishing an international voice award at Carmarthen's Trinity College, and is president of various charitable organizations throughout south Wales.

Notable recordings
Lensky in Tchaikovsky's Eugene Onegin with Georg Solti, which was also used as the score to Petr Weigl's filming of the opera

References

Sources
 Powell, Dean: Cilfynydd (2005), Tempus Publishing Ltd

External links

 Official website
 Stuart Burrows biography from BBC Wales Music
 BBC Wales page

1933 births
Living people
Officers of the Order of the British Empire
People from Pontypridd
Welsh operatic tenors
20th-century Welsh male opera singers